Admiral's Voyage (1959–1989) was an American thoroughbred horse that was bred and raced by Fred W. Hooper. Admiral's Voyage won 12 out of his 52 starts during four seasons of racing, earning a total of $455,879. As a three-year-old, Admiral's Voyage won the Wood Memorial and the Louisiana Derby, finished 9th to winner Decidedly in the 1962 Kentucky Derby and was a runner-up to Jaipur in the 1962 Belmont Stakes. The colt was then sent to race in California where he won the Los Feliz and San Miguel Stakes.

At stud
Admiral's Voyage was the sire of Pas de Nom who was bred to supersire Northern Dancer and produced the three-time Leading sire in North America Danzig.

Pedigree

References

1959 racehorse births
1989 racehorse deaths
Thoroughbred racehorses
Racehorses bred in Kentucky
Racehorses trained in the United States
American racehorses
Thoroughbred family 4-n